Gary Coleman (1968–2010) was an American actor.

Gary Coleman may also refer to:

Gary Coleman (Gaelic footballer) (born 1972), Irish Gaelic football player who played for Derry
Gary J. Coleman (born 1941), American leader in The Church of Jesus Christ of Latter-day Saints
Gary B.B. Coleman (1947–1994), American blues musician and record producer

See also
Gary Cole (born 1956), American actor
The Gary Coleman Show